The 1966–67 Yorkshire Cup was the fifty-ninth occasion on which the competition had been held.

Hull Kingston Rovers won the trophy by beating Featherstone Rovers by the score of 25-12.

The match was played at Headingley, Leeds, now in West Yorkshire. The attendance was 13,241 and receipts were £3,482

This was the  first of two successive victories for Hull Kingston Rovers.

Background 

This season there were no junior/amateur clubs taking part, no new entrants and no "leavers" and so the total of entries remained the same at sixteen.

This in turn resulted in no byes in the first round.

Competition and results

Round 1 
Involved  8 matches (with no byes) and 16 clubs

Round 1 - replays  
Involved  1 match and 2 clubs

Round 2 - quarterfinals 
Involved 4 matches and 8 clubs

Round 3 – semifinals  
Involved 2 matches and 4 clubs

Final

Teams and scorers 

Scoring - Try = three (3) points - Goal = two (2) points - Drop goal = two (2) points

The road to success

Notes and comments 
1 * Bramley were now playing their home matches at a new venue, McLaren Field

2 * Headingley, Leeds, is the home ground of Leeds RLFC with a capacity of 21,000. The record attendance was  40,175 for a league match between Leeds and Bradford Northern on 21 May 1947.

See also 
1966–67 Northern Rugby Football League season
Rugby league county cups

References

External links
Saints Heritage Society
1896–97 Northern Rugby Football Union season at wigan.rlfans.com
Hull&Proud Fixtures & Results 1896/1897
Widnes Vikings - One team, one passion Season In Review - 1896-97
The Northern Union at warringtonwolves.org

1966 in English rugby league
RFL Yorkshire Cup